Robert E. Casey (March 30, 1909 – December 1, 1982) was an American politician who served as Pennsylvania State Treasurer from 1977 to 1981. A Democrat from Johnstown, Pennsylvania, he served four terms as Cambria County recorder of deeds. No relation to influential politician Robert P. Casey Sr., his electoral victory in 1976 was aided by his name resemblance.

Life and career 
The youngest of eleven children of an Irish-American coal miner, Casey was born in Gallitzin, Pennsylvania. He graduated from Johnstown Catholic High School and studied accounting at the University of Pittsburgh at Johnstown. He worked at the state treasury department for seven years in the 1930s and then at a bank and mortgage and loan company in Johnstown. In 1956, he became deputy register of wills for Cambria County and served as Cambria's recorder of deeds from 1963 to 1976.

While he had never run for statewide elected office until 1976, Casey held numerous community and civic roles out of the public eye. He served as president of the Pennsylvania State Association of Recorders of Deeds and twice as president of the Pennsylvania State Association of Elected Officials. He had also served three years on the board of directors of the National Association of County Recorders and was appointed to a state commission to improve counties' record-keeping.

State treasurer 
During the 1976 election, Casey benefited from his name's similarity to popular outgoing Pennsylvania Auditor General Robert P. Casey Sr. (no relation). Johnny Durbin, a Harrisburg bar owner, encouraged Casey to run for treasurer after Robert P. Casey opted not to seek elected office in 1976. Casey barely campaigned, paid for only one newspaper advertisement, and spent exactly $866 to defeat party favorite Catherine Baker Knoll in the Democratic primary. He went on to win the general election, easily defeating the Republican nominee, state representative Patricia Crawford. His widest victory margin was in Lackawanna County, the home county of Robert P. Casey. The latter complained that the new treasurer was "an unwitting, undeserving beneficiary" of Robert P.'s name recognition, adding, "Frankly, I don't like being used."

Casey rewarded Durbin by appointing him to serve as deputy treasurer and a senior campaign aide. He launched a new investment program for state funds and purchased a $1 million computer to facilitate electronic record keeping. Casey lost his 1980 reelection bid to Republican nominee R. Budd Dwyer. In 1982, he announced plans to seek the Democratic nomination for lieutenant governor but withdrew from the race. He was a Knight of Columbus and board member of the local American Red Cross.

Personal life 
Casey was married to the former Mary Studeny, with whom he had three daughters: Doris, Mary Lou, and Karen. His wife and children survived him.

He died of a heart attack while vacationing in Odessa, Texas, on December 1, 1982.

References 

1909 births
1982 deaths
Politicians from Johnstown, Pennsylvania
People from Cambria County, Pennsylvania
20th-century American politicians
American accountants
Pennsylvania Democrats
State treasurers of Pennsylvania
University of Pittsburgh at Johnstown alumni